Christopher Gohl (born 23 May 1974) is a German political scientist and politician of the Free Democratic Party (FDP) who has been serving as a member of the Bundestag from the state of Baden-Württemberg since 2021.

Political career 
Gohl became a member of the Bundestag in 2021 when he replaced Christian Jung who had resigned. In parliament, he has since been serving on the Committee on Transport and Digital Infrastructure.

References

External links 

 Bundestag biography 

 

1974 births
Living people
Members of the Bundestag for Baden-Württemberg
Members of the Bundestag 2017–2021
Free Democratic Party (Germany) politicians